Nelson Tower is a 46-story,  building located at 450 Seventh Avenue between 34th Street and 35th Street in Midtown Manhattan, New York City.

History 
It was completed in 1931 and became the tallest building in the Garment District of Manhattan. Today it is dwarfed by the 60 story One Penn Plaza that sits across 34th Street from the Nelson Tower but still visible from most directions except the southeast. It was designed by H. Craig Severance. The building was originally planned and built by New York developer, Julius Nelson.

Architecture 
The building has a rectangular base and recedes at different places. Each section is of brown stone with the top of them lined with white stone. The crown is completely white stone and has a slight slope.

See also
 List of tallest buildings in New York City

References

External links 

Skyscraper office buildings in Manhattan
Art Deco architecture in Manhattan
Art Deco skyscrapers
Office buildings completed in 1931
1930s architecture in the United States
1931 establishments in New York City
Midtown Manhattan
34th Street (Manhattan)